Papilionanthe greenii is a species of epiphytic orchid native to Bhutan.

Ecology
This species has been recorded growing in subtropical lowland moist forests on Magnolia champaca (syn. Michelia champaca), Delonix regia, Lagerstroemia parviflora, Terminalia elliptica (syn. Terminalia tomentosa), and Samanea saman. The general habitat is subtropical lowland moist forest.

Conservation
This species is included in the CITES appendix II and thus its trade is regulated. However, the assessment of the IUCN red list categorizes this species as least concern (LC).

References

greenii
Orchids of Bhutan